Yaghleh Mazeh (also Romanized as Yāghleh Māzeh; also known as Yāqlimāzah) is a village in Bakesh-e Do Rural District, in the Central District of Mamasani County, Fars Province, Iran. At the 2006 census, its population was 21, in 7 families.

References 

Populated places in Mamasani County